Waikosel (also, Wai-ko-sel and Wicosels) is a former Native American settlement in Colusa County, California.

Its precise location is unknown.

References

Former Native American populated places in California
Former populated places in California
Native American populated places
Former settlements in Colusa County, California
Lost Native American populated places in the United States